Atmosphere is the eighth studio album of American house DJ and electronic dance music producer Kaskade. It was released in the United States and Canada on September 10, 2013, through Ultra Records.

Reception

The album shares similar success with his previous studio album Fire & Ice. It became Kaskade's second No. 1 on the Billboard Dance/Electronic Albums chart. It also made its debut at No. 16 on the Billboard Top 200 chart, as well as number 7 on the Billboard Digital Albums chart and number 2 on the Billboard Independent Albums chart. Atmosphere earned Kaskade his second Grammy nomination for Best Dance/Electronica Album in 2014.

The album received mixed reviews from mainstream critics. Metacritic rated Atmosphere an average score of 62 out of 100 based on 5 reviews, indicating "generally positive reviews".

Track listing

Credits and personnel
Credits adapted from AllMusic and Discogs.

Technical personnel
 Chuck Anderson – artwork
 Kevin Granger – mastering
 Stephanie LaFera – liner notes, management
 Mark Owens – photography

Additional musicians
 Stephanie Lang – vocals (1)
 Aaron Ashton – string arrangement (4)
 John Lee Hancock – string arrangement (4)
 Nicole Pinnell – cello (4)
 Jay Lawrence – vibraphone (6)

Chart performance

Release history

External links
 
 
  (deluxe edition track listing)

References

2013 albums
Kaskade albums
Ultra Records albums